Tatbir, also known as Talwar zani and Qama Zani in South Asia, is a form of ritual bloodletting, practiced as an act of mourning by some Shia Muslims, for the younger grandson of Muhammad, Husayn ibn Ali, who was killed along with his children, companions and near relatives at the Battle of Karbala by the Umayyad Caliph Yazid I.

Performance of Tatbir

Tatbir is practiced by some Shia Muslims on the 10 Muharram of the Islamic calendar, known as "the Day of Ashura", and on the 40th day after Ashura, Known as "Arba'een/Chehelom" by Twelvers around the world.  Some Shia may also perform tatbir on other occasions as well.

The practice of Tatbir includes striking oneself with a form of a talwar "sword" on the head, causing blood to flow in remembrance of the innocent blood of Imam Husayn. Some Twelvers also hit their back and/or chest with blades attached to chains.

Fatwas
Tatbir are contested among Shia clerics.  While some traditionalist clerics allow believers to indulge in tatbir, modernist clerics deem it impermissible because it is considered self-harm, thus haram in Islam. Most religious authorities associate all forms of self-flagellation and blood-letting as ways to relate to painful deaths during the battle of Karbala by Imam Husayn and supporters.

Criticisms 

 There are different opinion about the practice of Tatbir. Some Shia Marja believe that it is a form of self-harm, so it must be forbidden.  According to some Shia Marja, it is felt Tatbir reflects on Shia observers poorly, so they typically advise to avoid it in a region where Sunnis also reside.
 Iraqi sociologist Ibrahim al-Haidari has called Tatbir an irrational act. He states blood donations should replace Tatbir. Iraqi cleric Hussein Al-Sadr and his followers donate blood every year during the mourning of Husayn ibn Ali.
 Hassan Nasrallah, the leader of Hezbollah in Lebanon, has also taken steps to end Tatbir. Instead of practicing Tatbir, he offered to donate blood on Ashura day to patients who need it.
 Mohammad Mehdi Shamseddine established a blood bank in Najaf to donate blood on Ashura day to patients who need it.

See also

 Mourning of Muharram
 Battle of Karbala
 Criticism of Twelver Shia Islam

References

External links
 What is Tatbir?
 Tatbir is a wrongful and fabricated tradition

Mourning of Muharram
Shia fiqh
Islamic terminology
Islam-related controversies
Self-harm